The Japanese manga series Slam Dunk was written and illustrated by Takehiko Inoue. The series tells the story of a teenager named Hanamichi Sakuragi who becomes a basketball player from the Shohoku High School basketball team in order to make Haruko Akagi, a girl he likes, fall in love with him. However, as he learns more about basketball and plays several games, he starts liking the sport.

The series was originally published in Shueisha's Weekly Shōnen Jump since the issue 40 from 1990 until the issue 27 from 1996. The 276 individual chapters were originally collected in 31 tankōbon editions under Shueisha's Jump Comics imprint, with the first volume being published on February 8, 1991 and volume 31 on October 3, 1996. It was later reassembled in 24 kanzenban volumes from March 19, 2001 to February 2, 2002. A 20 volume shinsōban edition was published between June 1, 2018 and September 1, 2018. In 2004, Inoue produced an epilogue titled Slam Dunk: 10 Days After, which was drawn on 23 chalkboards in the former campus of the now-defunct Misaki High School located in the Kanagawa Prefecture, which was held for public exhibition from December 3 to December 5. The epilogue, along with coverage of the event, was reprinted in the February 2005 issue of Switch magazine. Toei Animation also adapted the manga into an anime series which premiered in Japan on October 23, 1993, and ended on March 23, 1996.

In North America, an English version of Slam Dunk was published by the now-defunct Gutsoon! Entertainment, which serialized the title in their manga anthology Raijin Comics from 2002 to 2004. Five collected volumes were published under Gutsoon's Raijin Graphic Novels imprint. They were released from July 2, 2003 until May 5, 2004. After Gutsoon! went out of business, the license for the Slam Dunk was purchased by Viz Media, which published a preview of the series in the December 2007 issue of the North American edition of Shonen Jump. Slam Dunk began serialization in the magazine, starting with the May 2008 issue, as well as in tankōbon format with the first being published on September 2, 2008. As of December 3, 2013, Viz has released all thirty-one volumes of the series.

Volume list

Notes

References

External links
 Slam Dunk Scholarship website at Shueisha 
 Slam Dunk  at Toei Animation
 

Slam Dunk
Chapters